Coliseum was an American punk rock band from Louisville, Kentucky, that was formed in 2003. They released five studio albums, the latest of which was Anxiety's Kiss on Deathwish Inc. In May 2015. Exclaim! named their 2010 album House with a Curse the No. 6 Punk Album of 2010.  After a 12-year run, Coliseum disbanded in 2015, although an official statement acknowledging this was not released until two years later (2017) when the band's lead vocalist Ryan Patterson introduced his new band, Fotocrime.

Members

At the time of disbanding
 Ryan Patterson – vocals, guitar
 Kayhan Vaziri – bass
 Carter Wilson – drums

Former
 Mike Pascal – bass
 Chris Maggio – drums
 Tony Ash – guitar
 Matt Jaha – drums
 Keith Bryant – bass

Discography

Studio albums
 Coliseum (2004, Level Plane)
 No Salvation (2007, Relapse)
 House with a Curse (2010, Temporary Residence)
 Sister Faith (2013, Temporary Residence)
 Anxiety's Kiss (2015, Deathwish)

EPs
 Demo (2004)
 Goddamage (2005, Auxiliary)
 Parasites EP (2011, Temporary Residence)
 Sister Chance EP (2013, No Idea)

Singles
 "True Quiet"/"Last Wave" (2009, Deathwish)

Splits
 Maximum Louisville Split Series Volume I (split with Lords) (2004, Auxiliary)
 Not of This World (split with Doomriders) (2005, Level Plane)
 Moral Damage (split with Lords) (2006, Destructure)
 Coliseum / Young Widows (split with Young Widows) (2006, Auxiliary)
 High on Fire / Coliseum / Baroness (split with High on Fire and Baroness) (2007, Relapse)
 Superchunk / Coliseum (split with Superchunk) (2011, Temporary Residence)

Music videos
 "Blind in One Eye" (2010)
 "Skeleton Smile" (2010)
 "One Last Night" (2012)
 "Black Magic Punks" (2013)
 "Bad Will" (2013)
 "Fuzzbang" (2013)
 "Love Under Will" (2013)
 "Doing Time" (2013)
 "We Are the Water" (2015)
 "Sunlight In A Snowstorm" (2015)
 "Dark Light Of Seduction" (2015)
 "Sharp Fangs, Pale Flesh" (2015)

References

External links
 
 

Hardcore punk groups from Kentucky
Musical groups from Louisville, Kentucky
2003 establishments in Kentucky
Deathwish Inc. artists
Musical groups established in 2003
Musical groups disestablished in 2015
Temporary Residence Limited artists
Level Plane Records artists
Relapse Records artists